Crisis (1939) is a feature-length documentary about the 1938 Sudeten Crisis. It was released briefly before the Nazi occupation of Czechoslovakia on March 15, 1939. The film was directed by Herbert Kline, Hans Burger, and Alexander Hammid, with narration written by Vincent Sheean and read by Leif Erickson. The National Board of Review named Crisis one of the ten best films of 1939.

References

External links

1939 documentary films
1939 films
American documentary films
Films directed by Alexandr Hackenschmied
American black-and-white films
1930s English-language films
Black-and-white documentary films
Documentary films about World War II
1930s American films